New York's 49th State Senate district is one of 63 districts in the New York State Senate. It has  been represented by Republican James Tedisco since 2017, succeeding retiring fellow Republican Hugh Farley.

Geography
District 49 is located in north-central New York covering all of Hamilton and Fulton Counties, as well as parts of Herkimer, Saratoga, and Schenectady Counties, including the city of Schenectady.

The district overlaps with New York's 21st and 24th congressional districts, and with the 110th, 111th, 112th, 113th, 114th, and 120th districts of the New York State Assembly.

Recent election results

2020

2018

2016

2014

2012

Federal results in District 49

References

49